"Dangerous Woman" is a song recorded by American singer Ariana Grande, serving as the lead single from her third studio album of the same name. It was written by Johan Carlsson, Ross Golan, and Max Martin, produced by Martin and Carlsson. The track was released as the first single from the album on March 11, 2016, the same date of the album's pre-order on iTunes Store. "Dangerous Woman" is a mid-tempo pop and R&B song.

With "Dangerous Woman" debuting at number ten on the US Billboard Hot 100, Grande became the first artist to reach the top ten of the chart in the opening charting week with every lead single of her three studio albums. Furthermore, the song became her fifth single to debut within the top ten in the United States, later peaking at number eight in its eleventh week. It was nominated for Best Pop Solo Performance at the 59th Annual Grammy Awards.

Background and release

In October 2015, Grande released "Focus" as the intended lead single from her third studio album, titled Moonlight at the time. The song was an immediate success, reaching the top ten on various charts worldwide. Although stating that the song was the perfect transition from her previous record to the new one, Grande ended up changing the album's title to Dangerous Woman, following which the title track was made available for digital consumption. On February 25, 2016, Grande launched a website titled dangerouswoman.com in order to promote the album and its lead single. Later, on March 1, 2016, she released the song's first preview, containing few of the recording's lyrics and some "studio chatter". On March 10, 2016, Grande premiered a one-minute preview during CBS' Victoria's Secret Swim Special, before finally releasing "Dangerous Woman" for digital download the next day. Four days later, the track was sent to United States contemporary hit radio.

"Dangerous Woman" was written and produced by Johan Carlsson and Ross Golan, with additional writing from Max Martin. In an interview with CBS This Morning, Golan revealed that the song was originally written with Carrie Underwood in mind, and was also pitched to Alicia Keys and Rihanna. It was ultimately given to Grande because Golan felt she really cared for the songwriters and would do the song justice. Carlsson performed guitar, piano, synths, tambourine and handled the production and programming with Max Martin who also contributed with vocal production. It was recorded at MXM Studios in Stockholm, Sweden. The song was mixed by Serban Ghenea at MixStar Studios in Virginia Beach, Virginia. The audio mastering was handled by Tom Coyne and Aya Merrill  at Sterling Sound in New York City.

Composition and lyrics

Musically, "Dangerous Woman" is a midtempo slow-jam pop, R&B and retro-soul song, with strong influences of rock music. It was described by Brennan Carley from Spin as a "woozy, big-band piece of moody R&B, one that "falls neatly at the intersection of bubblegum and rock and roll", The song is written in the key of E minor, while its tempo swings at a rate of 67 beats per minute in a compound duple  time. Grande's vocal range spans from D3 to B5. Various publications compared the track's vibe to The Weeknd's "Earned It". The song has a typical verse-pre-chorus-chorus structure; it begins with a chord progression of Em–G–C. The opening verses are accompanied by guitar chords and slow beats, which is followed by her belting in the pre-chorus. A guitar solo is present during the song's bridge. Although not officially credited as a composer for the music, American singer Charlie Puth can be heard beatboxing in the background of the track. Puth declared Carlsson added his beatboxing in order to achieve a higher frequency on the snare drum.

The arena rock chorus consist of the line, ""Somethin' 'bout you makes me feel like a dangerous woman", with Grande repeating the phrase's beginning at the end of each line. The refrain is backed by distorted synths and the guitar riff present during the first verse. Following the second chorus, Grande sings the hook, "All girls wanna be like that/Bad girls underneath, like that/You know how I'm feeling inside" accompanied by an electronic riff reminiscent of trap music. A reviewer from Sputnikmusic noted that the track's lyrics are "a cross between sexually charged and fully empowering." Commenting about the lyrical content of "Dangerous Woman", Grande stated: "This song is about an empowered woman who meets another person that brings out a different side of her. It's her decision to put her fears aside and explore these new feelings. It's about letting someone into your life in an intimate and vulnerable way and not letting that take away from your independence and strength."

Critical reception
The song received critical acclaim. Carolyn Menyes of Music Times complimented the song's time signature for adding "a bit of a waltz flavor, channeling the old school Ariana that fans first fell in love with", adding that "a sultry, distorted guitar line and Grande's passionate, soaring vocals add a sense of texture and modernity that makes 'Dangerous Woman' feel as powerful as the title." A writer of NME felt that Grande "shows herself as someone who continues to be determined to challenge the norm." The publication as well pointed out that "[the song] does sound empowered, even if it doesn't sound especially dangerous for her in the wake of her 2014 collaboration 'Love Me Harder' with The Weeknd." Writing for Idolator, Robbie Daw, Carl Williot and Mike Wass reviewed "Dangerous Woman" during their "Pop Perspective" article, with Daw calling it "one walk of danger worth taking", Williot praising her vocal performance and highlighting the "clever little flip of '(You Make Me Feel Like) A Natural Woman'", and Wass naming it a "decent song" but noting that "[she] still hasn't found her own lane." Lewis Corner from Digital Spy praised Grande's vocals, describing as "angelic" and completed writing it "almost sound too pure over the seductive guitar line and prowling beat, which threatens to blindfold you and tie up your wrists within one listen.". Reviewing the album with the same name, the editor from Sputnikmusic described the song as "the first moment that the album really shows flashes of becoming something special," and continued, "as it sways to a seductive beat that feels like it was extrapolated from the most revealing scene of a James Bond film." Quinn Maryland of Pitchfork shared similar opinion, the reviewer described it as "a slinky, empowered, Bond theme of a belter;"

Brennan Carley of Spin opined that "without a doubt, the most mature piece of music she's released to date. [...] The song is smart, sexy, captivating, and sung to total perfection." Tufayel Ahmed from Newsweek as well praised the song's maturity. Vulture.com's Sean Fitz-Gerald expressed that "Dangerous Woman" "flaunts the pop star's vocal control, starting out as a seductive whisper and slowly swelling into a heavy, swaying ear worm". Writing for AXS, Lucas Villa compared the song to The Weeknd's 2014 single "Earned It", saying that Grande "embrace[s] her grown woman side." He also added that "Ariana's powerful pipes take femme fatale to a whole new level." Maeve McDermott of USA Today considered it "her own version of a slinky Bond theme", while Jessie Morris of Complex called it "enchanting". Ailbhe Malone from Irish Times described the recording as "slinky and sexy, but tongue-in-cheek too. Imagine it as part of a Spotify playlist with Selena Gomez's 'Hands to Myself' and you're on the right track." Rolling Stone wrote that "the thrush-size diva with the five-alarm vocal power knocks out a sumptuously bluesy ode to her own awesomely lethal ladyhood." The magazine also named "Dangerous Woman" one of the thirty best songs of the first half of 2016: "This sultry, clever, bluesy stalk is full of unlikely patterns and pitch jumps, not to mention a guitar solo that explodes into Nintendo pixels and a vocodered outro. But for all its unique filigrees, there's an unstoppable chorus for one of pop's most pyrotechnic voices."

Commercial performance
In the United States, "Dangerous Woman" debuted at number 10 on the Billboard Hot 100 issue dated April 2, 2016, selling 118,000 digital downloads. It also reached the Digital Songs chart at number two. The recording became Grande's seventh top ten on the chart, and her second song after "Focus" to enter the top ten unaccompanied by another artist. She also set a record for debuting within the opening ten positions of the chart with every lead single—"The Way" and "Problem"—of her three studio albums. The single fell to number 13 in its second week, but gradually rebounded, reaching its peak position at number eight in its eleventh week. "Dangerous Woman" spent twenty weeks in the Hot 100's top forty, dropping to the closing positions starting with August 8, 2016. As of June 2020, the song has sold 1,150,000 copies in the country.

"Dangerous Woman" debuted at number 24 on Australia's ARIA Charts on the week ending March 27, 2016; it went on to reach number 18 on April 10, 2016, becoming her seventh top twenty single there. The song spent 13 weeks on the chart, with it being certified Platinum by the Australian Recording Industry Association (ARIA) for exceeding the 70,000 sales limit. In New Zealand, the song  peaked at number 16 on the New Zealand Singles Chart, being as well certified Platinum. In the United Kingdom, "Dangerous Woman" debuted and peaked at number 17 on the UK Singles Chart, marking Grande's fifth top twenty single in that territory after "Focus". Additionally, the recording gained a Platinum certification offered by the British Phonographic Industry (BPI) for selling 600,000 units.

Live performances
Grande provided her first televised performance of "Dangerous Woman" when she served as both host and musical guest on the March 12, 2016 episode of Saturday Night Live along with "Be Alright". She also sang the track as a special guest for Nicki Minaj's concert at the T-Mobile Arena on April 8, 2016, and performed the single at the 2016 MTV Movie Awards with Jason Robert Brown, the Tony-winning composer behind Grande's Broadway debut in the musical 13 in 2008. Grande also performed "Dangerous Woman" at The Voice season 10 finale alongside Christina Aguilera. The song was included on the setlist for Grande's 2017 Dangerous Woman Tour as a closing song. It was also performed on Grande's 2019 Sweetener World Tour.

Music video

A capella video
On March 20, 2016, Grande uploaded a video of the song to YouTube. The video shows Grande performing the entire song a capella in front of a beige background while wearing the latex bunny outfit shown on the album cover. At the end of the performance, the crew watching off-camera applaud wildly. The video has received over 104 million views.

Official video
For "Dangerous Woman", Grande planned to shoot two different versions of the music video. Grande previewed what became the sole accompanying music video for the single through social media on March 26, 2016, and March 29, 2016. The clip was officially premiered on Vevo in the night of March 31, 2016. Directed by production company The Young Astronauts. In interview with Idolator, Grande explained: “We’re doing two visuals because this song makes me feel two kinds of ways, it makes me feel sexy and glamorous — I wanted to do a simpler more glam-themed video — and then I wanted to do another video because it makes me feel... like a super version of myself in a way.” Discussing the song with Madeline Rotj from MTV, Grande stated about the concept behind the song's second video:

“This one's more cinematic and weird and tells a story. It's very different from the first one. I wanted to do a sexy, simple, more glamorous video, which was visual one. And then the second one is very different... it's very weird.”

The video opens with a vignette that presented the video as "visual 1". Sporting black lingerie, Grande is seen posing and singing in front of a curtain and on a bed. Shades of blue, purple and pink wash over her over the course of the video, which is just the singer on her own. Though she keeps a fairly stoic expression for the majority of the video, she is seen laughing towards the end as the screen fills with static. The video surpassed 100 million views on May 18, 2016, making it Grande's tenth VEVO-certified music video after "Right There" (2013). As of August 2022, the video has more than 670 million views, making it her 9th video to reach this milestones.

Cancellation of Visual 2
Grande initially planned to release two music videos for the song because it made her feel two different emotions, for which she felt two videos are needed to portray. She later confirmed that Visual 2 had been cancelled on her Twitter and Snapchat accounts. In a Q&A with fans, Grande later explained that the cancellation of Visual 2 was because she didn't have time. Further explanation on the cancellation came when a fan asked Grande about the video on Twitter on January 13, 2019. Grande responded to the fan, saying the video was a mess due to the visual effects not being realistic enough and that she didn't want to give her fans anything that is less than they deserve. Grande also revealed part of the concept for the video, saying "I like peeled my skin off my face and the dw mask was underneath." The mask she was referring to was the mask featured in the album's artwork and packaging. "It was ambitious for the time allotted to work on it lol. and also insane"

Credits and personnel 
Credits adapted from the liner notes of Dangerous Woman.

Recording and management
 Recorded at MXM Studios (Stockholm, Sweden)
 Mixed at MixStar Studios (Virginia Beach, Virginia)
 Mastered at Sterling Sound (New York City, New York)
 Published by MXM — administered by Kobalt — (ASCAP), Warner-Tamerlane Publishing Corp. (BMI) and Back in Djbouti (BMI)
 All rights administered by Warner-Tamerlane Publishing Corp. and MXM — administered by Kobalt — (ASCAP)

Personnel

Ariana Grande – lead vocals, background vocals, vocal production(all tracks)
Johan Carlsson – songwriting, production, vocal production, guitar, acoustic guitar, piano, synths, programming, tambourine, guitar solo
Max Martin – songwriting, production, vocal production, programming
Ross Golan – songwriting, background vocals
Serban Ghenea – mixing
John Hanes – mixing engineering

Sam Holland – engineering
Cory Bice – engineering
Peter Karlsson – engineering
Tom Coyne – mastering
Aya Merrill – mastering
Wendy Goldstein – artists and repertoire
Scooter Braun – artists and repertoire

Charts

Weekly charts

Year-end charts

Certifications and sales

Release history

References

2016 singles
2016 songs
Ariana Grande songs
Number-one singles in Greece
Republic Records singles
Song recordings produced by Ilya Salmanzadeh
Song recordings produced by Max Martin
Songs written by Max Martin
Songs written by Ross Golan
Songs written by Johan Carlsson (musician)